Ross Elliott Wales (born October 17, 1947) is an American former competition swimmer and Olympic Games medalist.  He represented the United States at the 1968 Summer Olympics in Mexico City, where he received a bronze medal in the men's 100-meter butterfly, finishing behind compatriots Doug Russell and Mark Spitz.

Wales was inducted into the International Swimming Hall of Fame in 2004.

See also
 List of members of the International Swimming Hall of Fame
 List of Olympic medalists in swimming (men)
 List of Princeton University Olympians
 List of Princeton University people

References

External links
 

1947 births
Living people
American male butterfly swimmers
Olympic bronze medalists for the United States in swimming
Sportspeople from Youngstown, Ohio
Princeton Tigers men's swimmers
Swimmers at the 1967 Pan American Games
Swimmers at the 1968 Summer Olympics
University of Virginia School of Law alumni
Medalists at the 1968 Summer Olympics
Pan American Games silver medalists for the United States
Pan American Games medalists in swimming
Medalists at the 1967 Pan American Games
20th-century American people
21st-century American people